Angel's Luck refers to a group of three science fiction novels by American writer Joe Clifford Faust.

Books 
Desperate Measures, June 1989, 
Precious Cargo, December 1989, 
The Essence of Evil, March 1990, 

1989 American novels
Science fiction book series
Space opera novels